Cambridge FA may refer to:
Cambridgeshire County Football Association
Cambridge University Association Football League